Julien Creuzet is a French artist. He will represent the country at the 60th Venice Biennale. Creuzet won Art Basel's 2022 Etant donnés Prize and was nominated for the 2021 Prix Marcel Duchamp.

References

Further reading

External links 

 

Living people
French artists
Year of birth missing (living people)